Marshall Ford is a small unincorporated community in Travis County, Texas, United States.

Mansfield Dam is built across a canyon in Marshall Ford, forming Lake Travis.

A post office operated in Marshall Ford between 1937 and 1942.

References

External links

Unincorporated communities in Texas
Unincorporated communities in Travis County, Texas